Kirby Puckett's 1991 World Series home run was a baseball play that occurred in Game 6 of the 1991 World Series on October 26, 1991, at the Hubert H. Humphrey Metrodome in Minneapolis, Minnesota.

Game 6 is widely considered to be one of the greatest World Series games ever played. With the Minnesota Twins facing elimination against the Atlanta Braves, and with the score tied 3–3 in the bottom of the 11th inning, Kirby Puckett stepped up to the plate and drove the game-winning home run off of Charlie Leibrandt into the left field seats to force a decisive Game 7.

This famously led to Jack Buck, who was broadcasting the game on CBS television to say "And we'll see you tomorrow night!" The home run was Puckett's only walk-off home run of his career.

Background
Seven players and five of the coaching staff from the 1987 World Champions ultimately repeated as 1991 World Champions. Only one man has been a part of each of the three Minnesota Twins World Series teams: Tony Oliva.  An outfielder in 1965, he was the hitting coach on the 1987 team and bench coach in 1991.

The Twins surprisingly did quite poorly in 1990, finishing last in the AL West division with a record of 74–88, 29 games behind the Athletics, the eventual World Series runner-up. 1991 brought breakout years from newcomers Shane Mack, Scott Leius, Chili Davis, and rookie of the year Chuck Knoblauch, along with consistently excellent performances from stars Hrbek and Puckett. The pitching staff excelled as well, with 20-game winner Scott Erickson, closer Rick Aguilera, and newly acquired free agent, St. Paul native Jack Morris, having all-star years. They all were contributors to the 1991 Twins' improvement from 74 wins to 95. Kirby Puckett led the way by batting .319, eighth in the league and Minnesota surged past Oakland midseason to capture the division title.

Bobby Cox returned to the Atlanta Braves' dugout as manager in the middle of the 1990 season, replacing Russ Nixon. The Braves would finish the year with the worst record in baseball, at 65–97, and traded Dale Murphy to the Philadelphia Phillies after it was clear he was becoming a less dominant player. However, pitching coach Leo Mazzone began developing young pitchers Tom Glavine, Steve Avery, and John Smoltz into future stars. That same year, the Braves used the number one overall pick in the 1990 MLB Draft to select Chipper Jones, who would go on to become one of the best hitters in team history. Perhaps the Braves' most important move, however, was not on the field, but in the front office. Immediately after the season, John Schuerholz was hired away from the Kansas City Royals as general manager.

The following season, Glavine, Avery, and Smoltz would be recognized as the best young pitchers in the league, winning 52 games among them. Meanwhile, behind position players Dave Justice, Ron Gant and unexpected league Most Valuable Player and batting champion Terry Pendleton, the Braves overcame a 39–40 start, winning 55 of their final 83 games over the last three months of the season and edging the Los Angeles Dodgers by one game in one of baseball history's more memorable playoff races. The "Worst to First" Braves, who had not won a divisional title since 1982, captivated the city of Atlanta (and, to a larger degree, the state of Georgia and the entire southeast) during their improbable run to the flag.

Postseason
The Twins then beat the Toronto Blue Jays in five games in the American League Championship Series as Puckett batted .429 with two home runs and five RBI to win the ALCS MVP. Meanwhile, the Braves defeated the Pittsburgh Pirates in a very tightly contested seven-game NLCS.

Braves manager Bobby Cox designated Leibrandt the starter for Game 1 of the World Series against the Minnesota Twins. Leibrandt got the start by virtue of his long post-season rest and the fact he was the only Braves starter who had ever pitched in the Metrodome. Leibrandt lost as he pitched decently but was outpitched by Jack Morris.

The setup

World Series Game 6

Going into Game 6, the Twins trailed three games to two with each team winning their respective home games. Puckett gave the Twins an early lead by driving in Chuck Knoblauch with a triple in the first inning. Puckett then made a leaping catch in front of the Plexiglass wall in left field to rob Ron Gant of an extra-base hit in the third. Puckett ultimately fell a double short of hitting for the cycle, getting two singles, a triple, and the homer.

The following box score is of Game 6 of the 1991 World Series.

The play
The game went into extra innings, and in the first at-bat of the bottom of the 11th, Puckett hit a dramatic game-winning home run on a 2–1 count off of Charlie Leibrandt to send the Series to Game 7. The first pitch of the inning was a change-up, which Puckett took for strike one. The next one was a similar high and outside fastball, which Puckett took for ball one; pitch three was another fastball for ball two. The fourth pitch, and last pitch of the game, was a weak, high change-up that failed to break.  Puckett made solid contact and sprinted for first, as was his usual practice. Only after he saw first base coach Wayne Terwilliger throw up his hands in victory did Puckett realize he had hit a home run.  Leibrandt was called upon to enter the game in a highly unfamiliar role – as a reliever late in the extra-inning game, and very late at night.

Cox endured some criticism for the move because the Braves still had several relievers at their disposal including left-hander Kent Mercker and right-handers Jim Clancy and Mark Wohlers, but the move made sense on another level, because Leibrandt was the only pitcher left on their roster who had previous World Series experience, and although Leibrandt had been subpar in his Game 1 start, the three hitters scheduled to bat for the Twins in the 11th had been a combined 0 for 6 against Leibrandt in that game, including two strikeouts of Puckett.

The calls

Jack Buck
As previously mentioned, Jack Buck, who was broadcasting the game for CBS television alongside Tim McCarver, famously called Puckett's home run  with the line "And we'll see you tomorrow night!". 20 years later, Buck's son Joe, who was broadcasting Game 6 of the World Series between the St. Louis Cardinals and Texas Rangers, for Fox with McCarver, also said  "...we will see you tomorrow night!" when describing David Freese's walk-off home run to send that World Series to a decisive seventh game.

John Gordon
In the Minnesota area, radio coverage of the 1991 World Series was broadcast on 830 WCCO AM. This is how John Gordon described Puckett's home run:

Vin Scully
Calling the game for a national radio audience on CBS Radio Sports alongside Johnny Bench and John Rooney, this is how Vin Scully described Kirby Puckett's game-winning home run:

Aftermath
In the final and deciding game, Jack Morris pitched a 10-inning shutout, viewed by many baseball historians as one of the greatest pitching performances in a 7th game of the World Series, to beat the Braves 1–0 and bring home the championship to Minnesota. It marked only the second time that the seventh game of the World Series had ever gone into extra innings. The Twins won on a walk-off RBI single by Gene Larkin in the bottom of the 10th inning. The seventh game of the 1991 World Series is widely regarded as one of the greatest games in the history of professional baseball.

1991 was considered to be the first season that any team that ended in last place the previous year advanced to the World Series; both the Twins and Braves accomplished the unprecedented feat. ESPN rated the 1991 World Series as the best ever played in a 2003 centennial retrospective of the World Series. As with the 1987 World Series, which the Twins also won, all 7 games were won by the home team.

The Twins were the first World Series champion to lose three away games and still win the series by winning all four home games; doing it in 1987 and again in 1991. The Arizona Diamondbacks duplicated this feat in 2001, when they became the first National League team to do so.

1992 saw another superb Athletic team that the Twins could not overcome, despite a 90–72 season and solid pitching from John Smiley. After that season, the Twins again fell into an extended slump, posting a losing record each year for the next eight years: 71–91 in 1993, 50–63 in 1994, 56–88 in 1995, 78–84 in 1996, 68–94 in 1997, 70–92 in 1998, 63–97 in 1999 and 69–93 in 2000. From 1994 to 1997, a long sequence of retirements and injuries hurt the team badly, and Tom Kelly spent the remainder of his managerial career attempting to rebuild the Twins.

Despite the 1991 World Series loss, the Braves' success would continue. In 1992, the Braves returned to the NLCS and once again defeated the Pirates in seven games, culminating in a dramatic game seven win. Francisco Cabrera's two-out single that scored David Justice and Sid Bream capped a three-run rally in the bottom of the ninth inning that gave the Braves a 3–2 victory. It was the first time in post-season history that the tying and winning runs had scored on a single play in the ninth inning.

Charlie Leibrandt again had the opportunity to play in the World Series with the Braves the following year. The Braves lost that series also, this time to the Toronto Blue Jays in six games. In the final game, in circumstances eerily similar to Game 6 of the prior year's Series, Leibrandt was called in as a reliever in an extra-inning game.  Just as in 1991, Cox was criticized for using Leibrandt as a reliever with closer Jeff Reardon and relievers Marvin Freeman and David Nied still available. Toronto rallied for two runs in the top of the 11th on a hit by Dave Winfield.  The Braves did manage to get one of those runs back in the bottom of the 11th; however, it was not enough and Leibrandt ended up as the losing pitcher.

Though the Twins didn't make it to the postseason for the rest of Puckett's career, he remained an elite player. In 1994, Puckett was switched to right field and won his first league RBI title by driving in 112 runs in only 108 games; a pace that projects to 168 RBIs over a full season. But the 1994 season was cut short by a players' strike.

Puckett after the 1995 season was forced to retire at age 35 due to loss of vision in one eye from a central retinal vein occlusion. He retired as the Twins' all-time leader in career hits, runs, doubles, and total bases. At the time of his retirement, his .318 career batting average was the highest by any right-handed American League batter since Joe DiMaggio. Puckett was the fourth baseball player during the 20th century to record 1,000 hits in his first five full calendar years in Major League Baseball, and was the second to record 2,000 hits during his first ten full calendar years. He was elected to the Baseball Hall of Fame in 2001, his first year of eligibility.

Legacy
This dramatic game has been widely remembered as the high point in Puckett's career. The images of Puckett rounding the bases, arms raised in triumph, are frequently included in video highlights of his career. After Game 6, the Twins replaced the blue seat back and bottom where the walk-off home run ball was caught with a gold-colored set. Both of these sets remain in the Twins' archives.  

The Twins reinstalled a blue seat back and bottom as well as Puckett's #34 on the seat where it remained until the final Minnesota Vikings game of 2013 in the Metrodome when, as local media reported, a fan took the #34 plate off the seat. The original home run seat armrests and hardware, as well as the replacement blue seat back and bottom, are now in a private collection of Puckett memorabilia in Minnesota after the Metrodome was torn down.

References

External links
KIRBY PUCKETT’S HISTORIC NIGHT POWERS THE TWINS TO A WIN IN GAME 6 OF THE WORLD SERIES
On this date: Kirby Puckett's walk-off HR carries Twins to Game 7
Meet the fan who caught Kirby Puckett's home run in Game 6 the 1991 World Series
25 YEARS AGO TODAY, KIRBY PUCKETT BECAME A WORLD SERIES HERO

Minnesota Twins postseason
Atlanta Braves postseason
1991 Major League Baseball season
World Series games
Historic baseball plays
1990s in Minneapolis
1991 in sports in Minnesota
October 1991 sports events in the United States
Baseball competitions in Minneapolis